Roger Tyler Jones (born April 22, 1969) is a former professional American football player who played cornerback for seven seasons for the Tampa Bay Buccaneers, Cincinnati Bengals, and Tennessee Oilers.

Upon the completion of his NFL career, he joined the coaching staff at Pope John Paul II High School in Hendersonville, Tennessee, serving as the school's head track coach and assistant athletic director

1969 births
Living people
Players of American football from Cleveland
American football cornerbacks
Tennessee State Tigers football players
Tampa Bay Buccaneers players
Cincinnati Bengals players
Tennessee Oilers players